Good Kid is a five-member indie rock band from Toronto, Ontario.

Good Kid consists of five members: lead vocalist Nick Frosst, drummer Jon Kereliuk, bassist Michael Kozakov, and guitarists David Wood and Jacob Tsafatinos. The band's mascot, known as Nomu Kid, is primarily featured in their marketing and social media. They released their first EP, titled Good Kid, in 2018. It was followed by Good Kid 2 two years later. In late 2020, the band gained popularity through the use of their music on Fortnite streams. The band released their music DMCA-free so that it could be used in streams, and multiple of their songs have since been added into the game.

History
Good Kid's first song, "Nomu", was released on October 13, 2015. It introduced the band's mascot, Nomu Kid, who was named after the song. In the following years, the band released more singles: "Atlas" on May 13, 2016, "Witches" on June 6, 2017, and "Tell Me You Know" on June 4, 2018. Their first EP, titled Good Kid, released on June 15, 2018.

In mid-2020, the band began releasing singles that would later be featured in their second EP: "Everything Everything" on July 20, "Drifting" on August 28, and "Down With the King" on September 2. Good Kid 2 was released on November 6, 2020. Its lead track, "Down With the King", was based on Donkey Kong Country; the lyrics describe the singer being stuck on the game and calling their friend for help.

Following the release of Good Kid 2, Good Kid launched an Alternate reality game on social media to promote a tie-in browser game called Ghost King's Revenge. The premise was that their mascot, Nomu Kid, had gone missing, and was captured by the antagonist of the game. Ghost King's Revenge featured a soundtrack consisting of both original music and chiptune arrangements of every Good Kid song featured on Good Kid and Good Kid 2.

In late 2020, Good Kid experienced a surge of popularity with the Fortnite community. Fortnite streamers on sites like Twitch and YouTube would often play Good Kid music in their streams, introducing it to their viewers. This extended to high-profile players such as FaZe Clan and Bugha. The band members began participating in these streams, retweeting Fortnite montages that included their music. Fortnite players campaigned for Good Kid music to be added to the in-game radio. In response, Epic Games asked Good Kid to send in two of their songs for inclusion; the band settled on "Witches", which was added that June, to positive reception by the band.

In response to the controversy over DMCA claims, and the amount of people including their music in streams, Good Kid allowed streamers to use their music free of charge, with no potential for takedowns. According to Tsafatinos, this reaction came from the band's observation that most streamers were young people who "just wanna play the music that they like on stream", and likely did not know about the DMCA system. The band proceeded to clear their later songs, such as "No Time to Explain", for free use in streams without DMCAs.

In 2021, Good Kid released a single called "Orbit." The early stages of the song had been composed in 2018, but since it did not fit with Good Kid's style of music, it was shelved. However, it was revisited to bring it more in-line with the band's music. Like "Witches", "Orbit" was also added to Fortnites radio.

Good Kid's next single, "No Time to Explain", was released on September 9, 2022. The following month, "No Time to Explain" was added to Fortnites radio.

Good Kid released another single, "First Rate Town," on January 27, 2023.

In 2023, they announced The Return of The Kid, their concert tour for the year. The tour was for all ages and happened from May 6 to June 2. The locations were mostly in the United States of America, aside for one show occurring in Toronto.

On March 16, Good Kid released their current newest single, "Mimi's Delivery Service".

Influences
Good Kid's initial work was inspired by 2000s indie rock and J-rock bands, such as The Strokes, Two Door Cinema Club, Bloc Party, and Kana-Boon. In 2019, they cited their current influences as PUP, Peach Pit, and Last Dinosaurs.

Members
 Nick Frosst – lead vocalist
 Jon Kereliuk – drummer
 Michael Kozakov – bassist
 David Wood – guitarist
 Jacob Tsafatinos – guitarist

Discography
EPs
 Good Kid (2018)
 Good Kid 2 (2020)
 Ghost King's Revenge (OST) (2020 chiptune/remix album)

Singles
 "Nomu" (2015)
 "Atlas" (2016)
 "Witches" (2017)
 "Tell Me You Know" (2018)
 "Slingshot" (2019)
 "Nomu x Animal Crossing" (2020)
 "Everything Everything" (2020)
 "Drifting" (2020)
 "Down With the King" (2020)
 "Orbit" (2021)
 "No Time to Explain" (2022)
 "First Rate Town" (2023)
 "Mimi's Delivery Service" (2023)

References

External links
 

Musical groups from Toronto
Musical groups established in 2015